Albeli is a Bollywood film. It was released in 1974. The film was directed by R. C. Talwar for Talwar Productions. It starred Vinod Mehra, Rehana Sultan, Nazima, Sujit Kumar, Mehmood. The music was composed by Kalyanji-Anandji.

Cast
Vinod Mehra as Vikas Chandra Verma
Rehana Sultan as Chameli
Nazima as Kamla
Sujit Kumar as Thakur
Mehmood

Soundtrack

References

External links
 

1974 films
1970s Hindi-language films
Films scored by Kalyanji Anandji
Indian romance films
1970s romance films
Hindi-language romance films